Ramones Mania 2 is a greatest hits album by American punk band Ramones that serves as a sequel to the band's first compilation album, Ramones Mania. It includes 25 Ramones songs, from the band's last three studio albums—Mondo Bizarro, Acid Eaters and ¡Adios Amigos!—and from the band's third live album, Greatest Hits Live, all of which were released on Radioactive Records. Although this compilation was released a decade after 1989's Brain Drain, it does not feature any songs from that album, as the band was with Sire Records at that time. It was released in 1999 as a Japanese-only release on EMI Japan. Unlike the first album, all the songs here are presented in chronological order. It is currently out of print.

Track listing

Personnel
Joey Ramone – lead vocals
Johnny Ramone – guitar
C.J. Ramone – bass, backing vocals
Marky Ramone – drums

References

2000 compilation albums
Ramones compilation albums